The Gene Generation is a 2007 biopunk science fiction film about an assassin who battles DNA hackers. The film was directed by Pearry Reginald Teo, and stars Bai Ling, Parry Shen, Faye Dunaway, and Alec Newman.

Synopsis
In a futuristic world, Michelle lives battling with DNA Hackers who use their skills to hack into people's bodies and kill them. She is an assassin, troubled by her past demons and trying to keep her younger and extroverted brother, Jackie, out of trouble. When Jackie is embroiled in a petty crime of robbery, he propels himself into the world of DNA Hackers, Shylocks (Loan Sharks) and Gang Fights. Wanting the respect that the world has never given to him only makes it harder for Jackie to peel himself away from the underground trades, against the hopes of his sister, Michelle. Michelle always wanted to leave the city and lead a calm and quiet lifestyle. As emotions and gunfire get into the way, Michelle and Jackie soon find themselves battling between their lives and finding out that in an immoral world, love can still survive; and that blood is thicker than water.

Cast
Bai Ling – Michelle
Parry Shen – Jackie
Alec Newman – Christian
Michael Shamus Wiles – Solemn
Faye Dunaway – Josephine Hayden
Robert David Hall – Abraham
Rebecca Parisi – Julianne
Tom Choi – Dad

Visual effects
Shero Rauf – 3D lead artist
Dobri Georgiev – lead CGI artist
Milen Jeliazkov – 2D lead artist

DVD release
It was released on Region 1 DVD on January 27, 2009, with the Region 2 release following on April 27, 2009.

Soundtrack and score
The soundtrack for the film features various tracks by Combichrist, Encephalon and Tribal Machine, while the score was composed by Scott Glasgow with additional music by Ronan Harris of VNV Nation. The score was released on CD by the Varèse Sarabande label in March 2009.

The following tracks are listed at the end of the film:

Sequel
On February 4, 2010, it was revealed that a sequel, The Gene Generation: War of the Bloodlines, was in development. Filming was due to begin in March 2010 and be completed by September 2010. However, since this announcement there have been no further details on the status of the production.

References

External links

The Gene Generation Soundtrack Review
 

2007 films
American science fiction action films
Biopunk films
Cyberpunk films
American dystopian films
2000s English-language films
2007 science fiction action films
Films about telepresence
Girls with guns films
Films adapted into comics
Films directed by Pearry Reginald Teo
2000s American films